The music of Miami is a diverse and important field in the world of music. The Greater Miami area has long been a hub for diverse musical genres. For example, South Florida has been a hub for Southern Rap.  Miami, in particular, is a "hub" for Latin Music in the United States. Miami bass (also known as booty music), a prominent hip-hop genre in the late 1980s and early 1990s, got its start in Miami; Luther "Luke Skyywalker" Campbell and his 2 Live Crew were among the more prominent Miami Bass acts, largely because of an obscenity scandal fomented by Broward County, Florida Sheriff Nick Navarro. Moreover, although not a South Florida native, Jimmy Buffett rose to prominence after moving to Key West, Florida and has long been associated with the "South Florida lifestyle". Other notable South Florida-based musical performers include Gloria Estefan, Marilyn Manson (began in Fort Lauderdale, Florida), Mental Crutch, Leslie Grace, Tony Succar, Vanilla Ice, DJ Laz, and Pitbull.

Miami music is varied. Cubans brought the conga and rumba, while Haitians and the rest of the French West Indies have brought kompa and zouk to Miami from their homelands instantly popularizing them in American culture. Dominicans brought bachata, and merengue, while Colombians brought vallenato and cumbia, and Brazilians brought samba. West Indians and Caribbean people have brought reggae, soca, calypso, and steel pan to the area as well.

Music history
The South Florida recording industry started in Miami in the 1950s with Criteria Studios, recording top selling albums such as Rumours by Fleetwood Mac and Hotel California by The Eagles.  Local music entrepreneur Henry Stone and his label, TK Records, created the local indie scene in the 1970s. T. K. Records produced the R&B group KC and the Sunshine Band along with soul singers Betty Wright, George McCrae and Jimmy "Bo" Horne as well as a number of minor soul and disco hits, many influenced by Caribbean music. Tom Dowd, an innovator in music engineering, worked out of Miami for many years and worked with a plethora of artists including Aretha Franklin, Ray Charles, Eric Clapton, Lynyrd Skynyrd. Tom Petty also came out of South Florida.

1970s–1980s
In the early 1970s, the Miami disco sound came to life with TK Records, featuring the music of KC and the Sunshine Band, with such hits as "Get Down Tonight", "(Shake, Shake, Shake) Shake Your Booty" and "That's the Way (I Like It)"; and the Latin-American disco group Foxy, with their hit singles "Get Off" and "Hot Number". They were on the very same South Florida label that released the first disco song to become a #1 hit on the pop music charts, "Rock Your Baby" by Miami area native George McCrae in 1974.  Other artists from that local label include Foxy, Peter Brown, Jimmy "Bo" Horne, Gwen McCrae, T-Connection, and Anita Ward. Miami native Teri DeSario was also a popular artist during the disco era. The Bee Gees moved to Miami in 1975 and have lived here ever since then.

Miami-influenced, Gloria Estefan and the Miami Sound Machine, hit the popular music scene with their Cuban-oriented sound and had hits in the 1980s with "Conga" and "Bad Boy".

1990s
The 1980s and '90s also brought the genre of high energy Miami bass to dance floors and car subwoofers throughout the country. Miami bass spawned artists like 2 Live Crew (featuring Uncle Luke), 95 South, Tag Team, 69 Boyz, Quad City DJ's, and Freak Nasty. Examples of these songs are "Whoomp! (There It Is)" by Tag Team in 1993, "Tootsee Roll" by 69 Boyz in 1994, and "C'mon N' Ride It (The Train)" by the Quad City DJ's in 1996.

Cuban and Latino influences
The influence of Cuban culture and music history on the music of South Florida is undeniable. The 1997 hit album Buena Vista Social Club was performed by a group featuring former stars of the Havana nightclub scene. It won a Grammy, became a hit, and was listed in 2003 by Rolling Stone magazine as #260 in The 500 Greatest Albums of All Time.

Cuban American female recording artist Ana Cristina was born in Miami in 1985.

In 2017, the music video for "Despacito" by Luis Fonsi featuring Daddy Yankee reached over a billion views in under 3 months. As of December 2020, the music video is the second most viewed YouTube video of all-time. With its 3.3 million certified sales plus track-equivalent streams, "Despacito" became one of the best-selling Latin singles in the United States. Reggaeton artist Bad Bunny released X 100pre in that one year later that in which in 2020 the album was ranked number 447 on Rolling Stone's 500 Greatest Albums of All Time list.

MTV Latin America is based in Miami, serving residents in Mexico, Argentina, Venezuela, and other Latin American countries since 1993.

Popular music

Electronic dance music

Electronic dance music (EDM) and its subgenres have been important in South Florida. Miami is considered a "hot spot" for dance music. Starting in the 1970s with acts like Jimmy Bo Horne and KC and The Sunshine Band, dance music coming out of Florida could be heard all over the world. With the demographics of South Florida being made up of Cuban, Haitian, and many other Afro-Caribbean cultures, dance music became very popular, adopting a lot of the grooves and percussion from those cultures. Early on, the dance scene in South Florida was mostly playing the EDM subgenres disco, house, and freestyle. Freestyle, a style of dance music popular in the 1980s and 90s, was heavily influenced by electro, hip-hop, and disco. Many popular Freestyle acts such as Pretty Tony, Debbie Deb, Stevie B, and Exposé, originated in Miami.

In the 1980s, due to a combination of clubs staying open till 5 AM and the glut of easily available drugs, Miami's dance scene began to get noticed internationally. In 1985 the Winter Music Conference, a yearly, week-long dance music conference/convention/showcase started in South Florida. The event has happened in Miami ever since. WMC as it is also known as, is famous as well for its Ultra Music Festival which happens the same week. By the 1990s many local DJs and producers where getting noticed. Acts like Murk, aka Funky Green Dogs, Planet Soul, and DJs like Robbie Rivera, were all getting air play not just in Florida but around the world. Clubs like Space, Crobar, and Mansion also attracted first class international DJ as well increasing the musics popularity.  Miami would wind up allowing its night clubs to stay open 24 hours on the weekend. Thus increasing the demand for dance music. Clubs would regularly have internationally known DJs as well as local acts such as Ivano Bellini, Patrick M, and a long list of others spin into the next day.

There was also a period of alternatives to nightclubs, the warehouse party, acid house, rave and outdoor festival scenes of the late 1980s and early 1990s were havens for the latest trends in electronic dance music, especially house and its ever-more hypnotic, synthetic offspring techno and trance, in clubs like the infamous Warsaw Ballroom better known as Warsaw and The Mix where DJs like David Padilla (who was the resident DJ for both) and radio. The new sound fed back into mainstream clubs across the country. The scene in SoBe, along with a bustling secondhand market for electronic instruments and turntables, had a strong democratizing effect, offering amateur, "bedroom" DJs the opportunity to become proficient and popular as both music players and producers, regardless of the whims of the professional music and club industries. Some of these notable DJs are John Benetiz (better known as JellyBean Benetiz), Danny Tenaglia, and David Padilla.

Today Miami is home to a vibrant techno and dance scene, and hosts the Winter Music Conference, the largest dance event in the world, Ultra Music Festival and many electronica music-themed celebrations and festivals. Currently, the EDM subgenres popular in South Florida are deep house, tech house and techno.

Hip hop

Southern rap is a category of hip hop music that arose from the influences of hip hop culture in New York City and California in the late 1990s in cities such as Miami, New Orleans, Atlanta, Memphis, Houston, and Dallas.  Miami and Southern Florida are a major hub and driving force for Southern rap. Floridian artists such as Plies, Epitaph, DJ Laz, Trick Daddy, Pitbull, Flo Rida, Stack$, JT Money, Carl Lovett, Rick Ross, Trina, Jacki-O, Gold Rush, Pretty Ricky, and 2 Live Crew.

In the 2010s, Miami had a growing scene based around cloud rap that began to emerge with rappers such as SpaceGhostPurrp, Yung Simmie and Denzel Curry. Traditional trap music normal in other areas of the south such as Atlanta and Texas began to gain popularity in Florida with artists like Kodak Black entering the mainstream. Curry and Kodak Black were later featured on the XXL 2016 Freshmen cover, which features the rappers generally breaking into the mainstream and on the verge of being popular.

In 2017, breakout artist XXXTentacion brought the "soundcloud rap" movement towards the mainstream. The movement, predominately based in South Florida takes its name from the audio distribution platform Soundcloud where the artists generally post their music. The style of music, brought forward by SoundCloud rap, is heavily distorted bass, intentionally bad mixing and fast tempos. The main artists in this movement are XXXTentacion, Lil Pump, Wifisfuneral, Ski Mask the Slump God and Smokepurpp. XXXTentacion was featured on the XXL 2017 Freshman cover. Lil Pump, Ski Mask The Slump God, Smokepurrp, and Wifisfuneral were all featured on the XXL 2018 Freshman cover.

Miami bass

Miami bass is a popular style of music from the Miami area of South Florida and is embodied by the musical style of local rap stars such as Trick Daddy. Miami bass is a part of the robust music scene in the South Florida metropolitan area, which comprises cities such as Miami, West Palm Beach, and Fort Lauderdale. These cities have many locally famous rappers and DJs who are on their way up in the rap game.

Miami bass is a booming, bass-heavy style of hip hop that developed in the mid-1980s in Miami.  The distinctive sound evolved from electro hop, including sounds from Luther Campbell and his group, 2 Live Crew. The Miami bass scene that 2 Live Crew typified is simply one form of southern rap and Miami bass' club-oriented sound garnered little respect from hip hop fans. But the 2 Live crew is not the only music artist in Miami. This city also holds Trick Daddy, DJ Uncle Al, Rick Ross, Trina, Jacki-O, Pitbull, Cool & Dre, DJ Khaled, Smitty, DJ 2nen, Pretty Ricky, BlackMask and many more. Miami rapper Trick Daddy also grew up in the Liberty Square of the Liberty City section of Miami, one of the city's and America's roughest areas. The city of Miami is also home to the label Slip "N" Slide Records.

Miami bass innovators include Maggotron and Luther Campbell's 2 Live Crew.  The lyrics to Miami bass are sexually explicit, so when 2 Live Crew achieved national attention, these lyrics caused a controversy.  Several music stores were prosecuted under obscenity laws for selling the disc, and the members of 2 Live Crew were arrested for performing songs from the album Nasty As They Wanna Be. The charges were subsequently dropped.

Rock
The Miami rock scene had a particularly successful period in the late 1980s to mid-1990s as well as early 2000’s, sparked by the many rock and acoustic venues within South Beach and Fort Lauderdale.  Popular local artists included The Mavericks, Nuclear Valdez, Marilyn Manson, Nonpoint, Nil Lara, Ed Hale, Harry Pussy. Ska punk band Against All Authority is from Miami, and rock/metal bands Nonpoint and Marilyn Manson each formed in Fort Lauderdale. Indie/folk acts Cat Power and Iron & Wine are based in the city.

See also
 List of songs about Miami
 Southern Rap
 Reggaeton
 Music of Florida
 Donk (automobile)
 South Florida Punk and Hardcore

References

 
Culture of Miami
Music scenes
Music of Florida
Miami